Argyrocytisus battandieri, the pineapple broom or Moroccan broom is a species of flowering plant in the legume family, Fabaceae, subfamily Faboideae. It is the only member of the genus Argyrocytisus (formerly Cytisus battandieri).

The cultivar ‘Yellow Tail’ has gained the Royal Horticultural Society’s Award of Garden Merit. It was introduced to the UK as recently as 1922, and for a long time was thought less hardy than plants have proved.

References

Genisteae
Monotypic Fabaceae genera
Taxa named by René Maire